The Manoir d'Eyrignac is a 17th-century manor house in Salignac-Eyvigues, in the Dordogne department of France, surrounded by a recreated 18th-century Italian Renaissance garden and an elaborate topiary garden. The house is sited on top of a hill, with water coming from seven springs.  Only a pavilion, fountains and basins remain from the original 18th-century garden.  In the 1960s, the new owner, Giles Sermadiras de Cuzols de Lile, created the new garden, which features topiary sculptures, vistas, fountains, statues, and an allée of vases. The garden is listed by the Committee of Parks and Gardens of the French Ministry of Culture as one of the Notable Gardens of France.

The 7 gardens  
 The White garden 
 Greenery sculptures 
 The Chinese Pagoda 
 The Springs Garden and Wild Flower Meadows 
 The Kitchen Garden and the Flower Garden 
 The Manor of Artaban 
 French Garden

External links

 Official website
 Site of the Committee of Parks and Gardens of the Ministry of Culture of France

Botanical gardens in France
Gardens in Dordogne